David Burns (June 22, 1902 – March 12, 1971) was an American Broadway theatre and motion picture actor and singer.

Life and career
Burns was born on Mott Street in Chinatown, Manhattan. He made his Broadway debut in 1923 in  Polly Preferred  and went to London with the show in 1924. His first musical was Face the Music in 1932, and Cole Porter's Nymph Errant (1933) was his London debut. He appeared in many comedies and musicals over an almost 50-year career.

He won two Tony Awards for Best Featured Actor in a Musical, for his performances as "Mayor Shinn" in The Music Man (1958) and as "Senex" in A Funny Thing Happened on the Way to the Forum (1963).

Burns introduced the hit song "It Takes a Woman" from Hello, Dolly (1964) as the original "Horace Vandergelder".

Burns won a Primetime Emmy Award for Outstanding Supporting Actor – Drama Series for his role of Mr. Solomon in the 1971 TV special (Hallmark Hall of Fame) The Price by Arthur Miller.

Death
Burns died on stage on March 12, 1971, of a heart attack in Philadelphia during the out-of-town tryout of Kander and Ebb's musical 70, Girls, 70.

Selected credits

Stage

Film

Television

Awards and nominations

Further reading
 Oderman, Stuart, Talking to the Piano Player 2. BearManor Media, 2009. .

References

External links

 
 
 
 Who's Who in Musicals

1902 births
1971 deaths
20th-century American male actors
American expatriate male actors in the United Kingdom
American male film actors
American male musical theatre actors
American male stage actors
Deaths onstage
Male actors from New York City
Outstanding Performance by a Supporting Actor in a Drama Series Primetime Emmy Award winners
People from Chinatown, Manhattan
Tony Award winners
20th-century American male singers
20th-century American singers